Yippee TV is an American children’s subscription video on-demand over-the-top streaming service, founded in December 2019 and is based in Los Angeles, California. Through a partnership with NBCUniversal and Big Idea Entertainment, Yippee TV became the exclusive streaming service of the Christian computer generated musical children's animation series The VeggieTales Show in 2019.

History
Yippee TV was founded by Brandon Piety in Los Angeles and is accessible worldwide on Roku, AppleTV, Fire TV, Samsung TV, iOS, and Android apps. Regarding the vision behind the streaming service, Piety explained that Yippee "was built by parents for parents. There are no ads, algorithms, or attitudes, and the shows on our platform are safe and actually fun." When the service launched in December 2019, Yippee TV had over 1000 hours of streaming content. In March 2021, Yippee TV announced it had over 50,000 active monthly users. As of March 2022 the service had "over tens of thousands of paying subscribers."

Programming
Yippee TV is the exclusive streaming service of The VeggieTales Show and released new episodes monthly in 2020 and 2021 into 2022.   
Original programs on Yippee TV include the world's first car show for kids, Backseat Drivers, Pete and Penelope, and This Cosmic Planet. Yippee TV premiered Making Magic at Home with Justin Flom and offers the shows Madeline, The Busy World of Richard Scarry, The Yippee Show, Jay Jay the Jet Plane, Time2Dance, Hermie and Friends and Adventures from the Book of Virtues.'' Yippee TV also features content curated from YouTube and faith-based programming. Reviews of the service's content are positive, with Playlister noting "With a staggering selection of 5-star reviews to view online, it is clear that Yippee is a family favorite."

References

External links 
 

2019 establishments in California
Internet television streaming services
American entertainment websites
Internet properties established in 2019
Companies based in Los Angeles
Internet television channels
Subscription video on demand services